The 1988 BYU Cougars football team represented Brigham Young University during the 1988 NCAA Division I-A football season. The Cougars were led by 17th-year head coach LaVell Edwards and played their home games at Cougar Stadium in Provo, Utah. The team competed as members of the Western Athletic Conference, finishing tied for third with a record of 9–4 (5–3 WAC). BYU was invited to the 1988 Freedom Bowl, where they defeated Colorado.

Schedule

Personnel

Season summary

Texas

at Air Force

References

BYU
BYU Cougars football seasons
BYU Cougars football